is a Japanese graphic artist who works predominantly in anime and manga. He first gained fame in his work on the avant-garde anime Serial Experiments Lain. He is also responsible for the concept and character design for the series NieA_7. He is the creator of the dōjinshi Haibane Renmei, which was also adapted into an anime.

He is a colleague and friend of Chiaki J. Konaka, with whom he collaborated on the series Serial Experiments Lain and Texhnolyze. He usually uses the romaji form of his name instead of the kanji, with the "B" in "ABe" capitalized, as a reminder of his early works, for which he used the pen name "AB".

Abe first began his career as a teen in Tokyo who was first recognized as a graffiti artist, who regularly got into legal problems with his art. His concepts for all his later works are said to be inspired by this time of his life and has projected a dark theme into his anime character designs.

He is known to be a fairly tech-savvy manga artist, drawing a sketch with just his finger and an application on an iPad. He released self-published dōjinshi on digital support bypassing the traditional print publishers with Pochiyama at the Pharmacy in 2008 aimed at iPhone and iPod Touch and I am an Alien, I have a Question in 2010 for Kindle.

Personal life
On November 11, 2011, ABe married artist Sasaki Yukari, his manga assistant since 2010. Their daughter was born on September 21, 2012.

Works

Anime
 Serial Experiments Lain (1998) (original character design)
 NieA_7 (2000) (original character design, scenario)
 Haibane Renmei (2002) (original creator, original character design, series composition, screenplay)
 Texhnolyze (2003) (original character design)
 Welcome to the N.H.K. (2006) (original character design)
 RErideD: Derrida, who leaps through time (2018) (original character design, screenplay for episodes 4, 8, and 10)
 Housing Complex C (2022) (original character design)
 Despera (TBA) (original character design)

Music
 Love Song (2005) (cover art and booklet illustrations)

Video games
 Wachenröder (1998)
 Phenomeno (2012)

Printed works
Dōjinshi
 Furumachi (August, 1996)
 Shooting Star (December, 1996)
 White Rain (July, 1997)
 Sui-Rin (August, 1998)
 Charcoal Feather Federation (Haibane Renmei) (December, 1998)
 T.Prevue Version 0.9 (August, 1999)
 Faces (December, 1999)
 K.S.M.E (July, 2000)
 Sketches (December, 2000)
 NieA Under 7 - Under (August, 2001)
 Haibane Renmei - The Haibanes of Old Home (Ch.1) (August, 2001)
 Haibane Renmei - The Haibanes of Old Home (Ch.2) (December, 2001)
 Haibane Renmei - Haibane Lifestyle Diary (August, 2002)
 Haibane Renmei - The Haibanes of Old Home (Extra) (December, 2002)
 Ryuu Tai (July, 2003)
 Not Found (December, 2003)
 Haibane Renmei - Kyakuhonshuu - Volume 1 (August, 2004)
 Haibane Renmei - Kyakuhonshuu - Volume 2 (December, 2004)
 Haibane Renmei - Kyakuhonshuu - Volume 3 (December, 2004)
 Miscellaneous (December, 2004)
 GRID. (August, 2005)
 Haibane Renmei - Kyakuhonshuu - Volume 4 (December, 2005)
 Haibane Renmei - Kyakuhonshuu - Volume 5 (December, 2005)
 Yakkyoku no Pochiyamasan (December, 2005)
 Haibane Renmei - Kyakuhonshuu - Volume 6 (August, 2006)
 Yakkyoku no Pochiyamasan 2.0 (August, 2006)
 Yakkyoku no Pochiyamasan 3.0 (August 19, 2007)
 f.p.o. (Fixed Point Observation) (August 17, 2008)
 Ryuhshika (August 17, 2008)
 Yakkyoku no Pochiyamasan 4.0 (December 30, 2008)
Artbooks
 Serial Experiments Lain - An Omnipresence in the Wired (May, 1999)
 Visual Experiments Lain
 Essence (May, 2001) *Released in the US*
 NieA Under 7 - Scrap (July, 2001)
 Haibane Renmei - In the Town of Guri, in the Garden of Charcoal Feathers (December, 2003)
 yoshitoshi ABe lain illustrations - ab# rebuild an omnipresence in the wired (Japan: December 2005; US: April 2006)
 Gaisokyu (August, 2007)
Manga
 Ame no Furu Basho (debut) Afternoon (April 1994)
 NieA Under 7 (Vol. 1) (June, 2001)
 NieA Under 7 (Vol. 2) (August, 2001)
 All You Need Is Kill (December, 2004)
 Ryushika Ryushika (2009)
Contributions
 Mutekei Fire - Tarame Paradise Doujins
 Mutekei Fire - Great Pictorial Guide of Uki-Uki in the World Doujins
 Mutekei Fire - Tokimeki Shitsumon Bako Doujins
 Range Murata - Flat
 Range Murata - Rule - Fa Documenta 003
 Range Murata - Robot - Volume 01
 Range Murata - Robot - Volume 02
 Range Murata - Robot - Volume 03
 Range Murata - Robot - Volume 04
 Range Murata - Robot - Volume 05
 Range Murata - Robot - Volume 06
 Range Murata - Robot - Volume 07
 Range Murata - Robot - Volume 08
 Range Murata - Robot - Volume 09
 Range Murata - Robot - Volume 10 with "U.C.O."
 Foo Swee Chin - Muzz Doujins 1-2
 Akai Kiba (Red Fang) - Volumes 1-4
 Hell Girl, episode 13 - sketches and wallpaint
Cover Illustrations
 Kami no Keifu Novels 1-3
 Welcome to the N.H.K.
 Negative Happy Chainsaw Edge
 Chojin Keikaku (bunko edition only)
 Slip Manga Collection
 All You Need is Kill
Misc.
 "AB Note" yoshitoshi ABe Sketchbook (GoFa 2003)
 "GoFa Portfolio Collection A" 20 A4 Prints (sold by GoFa at AX2003 - 100 made)
 "GoFa Portfolio Collection B" 20 A4 Prints (Sold by GoFa at AX2003 - 100 made)
 "Kaira" Wani Magazine Comics Special (July, 2008)

References

External links
  
 
 
 Yoshitoshi ABe manga , anime  at Media Arts Database 
 Pixiv account
 
 

1971 births
Living people
Manga artists from Tokyo
Anime character designers
Japanese bloggers
Tokyo University of the Arts alumni